The X Army Corps was a military formation belonging to the Spanish Republican Army that fought during the Spanish Civil War. During the war it was deployed on the fronts of Aragon, Segre and Catalonia.

History 
The unit was created in June 1937, within the Eastern Army. It covered the front line that ran from the French border to the Sierra de Alcubierre, with its headquarters in Barbastro. During the following months some of its forces intervened in the offensives of Huesca (June), Zaragoza (August) and Biescas (September-October), which, however, did not bear the desired results: both Huesca and Jaca remained in the hands of the nationalist forces.

In the spring of 1938, during the Aragon Campaign, the X Army Corps performed poorly. From the first moment its forces fell back from the enemy push, particularly the 31st Division, whose withdrawal —Which eventually became a rout— left the southern flank of the 43rd Division unprotected. At the beginning of April the X Army Corps, after a long retreat, they maintained their positions on the defensive line of the Segre River. Some elements of its 34th Division intervened in the Balaguer Offensive at the end of May. At the beginning of the Catalonia Campaign the X Army Corps continued to cover the Segre line. Its troops offered resistance to the nationalist assault, although at the beginning of 1939 the formation was forced to withdraw towards the French border along with the rest of the Eastern Army.

Command 
 Commanders
 José González Morales;
 Juan Perea Capulino;
 Miguel Gallo Martínez;
 Rafael Trigueros Sánchez-Rojas;
 Gregorio Jover Cortés;

 Commissars
 Julián Borderas Pallaruelo, of the  PSOE;
 Gregorio Villacampa Gracia, of the  CNT;
  Juan Manuel Molina, of the  CNT;

 Chiefs of Staff
 Joaquín Alonso García;
 Pascual Miñana de la Concepción;
 Magín Doménech Pujol;
 Enrique López Pérez;

Order of Battle

Notes

References

Bibliography 
 
 
 
 
 
 
 
 
 

Military units and formations established in 1937
Military units and formations disestablished in 1939
Corps of Spain
Military units and formations of the Spanish Civil War
Military history of Spain
Armed Forces of the Second Spanish Republic
1937 establishments in Spain
1939 disestablishments in Spain